Siah (an acronym for Smol Israeli Hadash, ("Israeli New Left")) was an Israeli left-wing group active between 1968 and 1973. Reuven Kaminer describes them as "the major force of the student left in the 1968–1973 period." As their name suggests, the group's language, organization, and tactics were influenced to some extent by the global New Left.

Siah was a combination of two groups in Tel Aviv and Jerusalem that had been created independently. The Tel Aviv group was initially created by Mapam supporters at Tel Aviv University who chose to break away from the party in protest against its decision to ally itself with Mapai. These were soon joined by former members of Maki. The Jerusalem group was made up of Hebrew University students with less political experience, some of them recent immigrants who had come to Israel to fight in the Six-Day War. The Tel Aviv members saw themselves as Zionists, while "the Jerusalemites considered themselves a-Zionists or even anti-Zionists." Siah's leading activists included Ran Cohen, Dani Peter, Yossi Amitai, Benyamin Cohen, and Zvika Deutch.

An important action by Siah members in 1972 is documented in the book My Home, My Prison by Raymonda Hawa Tawil. Following the refusal of villagers from Akrabeh to sell to Jewish settlers in 1972, the Israeli military declared fields used by the people of Akrabeh to be in a training, firing zone, dangerous and off limits. When no training appeared, villagers began to till and plant the land until April 28, 1972 when an Israeli plane dropped an unknown chemical on the fields killing the plants and poisoning the land. Eighty members of Siah demonstrated in support of "Palestinian self-determination" and the villagers of Akrabeh. Some were arrested and prosecuted, even court-martialed.

Siah broke apart in 1973 over the issue of reentering electoral politics, which most of the Tel Aviv group supported and most of the Jerusalem group opposed. The former faction, which called itself the "Blue-Red Movement" (blue for Zionism, red for socialism), became part of Moked.

Notes

External links
Siah description and documents at the Israeli Left Archive
Siach: Israel New Left 1971 English-language publication by the group
Blue-Red Movement documents at the Israeli Left Archive (in Hebrew)

Left-wing politics in Israel
Political organizations based in Israel
New Left